Burn 'Em Up Barnes is a 1921 American silent comedy action film directed by George Beranger and starring Johnny Hines, Edmund Breese and George Fawcett. It was loosely remade as a 1934 film of the same title.

Cast
 Johnny Hines as Johnny 'Burn 'em Up' Barnes
 Edmund Breese as King Cole
 Betty Carpenter as Madge Thompson
 George Fawcett as 	Flannel
 J. Barney Sherry as Whitney Barnes
 Matthew Betz as Ed Scott 
 Richard Thorpe as Stephen Thompson
 Julia Swayne Gordon as Mrs. Whitney Barnes
 Dorothy Leeds as Betty Scott
 Harry Frazer as Francis Jones 
 Billy Boy Swinton as 	The Baby

References

Bibliography
 Connelly, Robert B. The Silents: Silent Feature Films, 1910–36, Volume 40, Issue 2. December Press, 1998.
 Munden, Kenneth White. The American Film Institute Catalog of Motion Pictures Produced in the United States, Part 1. University of California Press, 1997.

External links
 

1921 films
1921 comedy films
1920s English-language films
American silent feature films
Silent American comedy films
Films directed by George Beranger
American black-and-white films
1920s American films